Jowgh-e Now (also known as Chūnūyeh, Joghūneh, Jowqūneh, and Jūghūneh) is a village in Kuh Panj Rural District, in the Central District of Bardsir County, Kerman Province, Iran. Its existence was noted in the 2006 census, but its population was not reported.

References 

Populated places in Bardsir County